Adrianus van Korlaar (26 June 1882 – 12 May 1956) was a Dutch sports shooter. He competed in the team free rifle event at the 1924 Summer Olympics.

References

External links
 

1882 births
1956 deaths
Dutch male sport shooters
Olympic shooters of the Netherlands
Shooters at the 1924 Summer Olympics
People from Maasdriel
Sportspeople from Gelderland